Gafsheh-ye Lasht-e Nesha Rural District is a rural district (dehestan) in Lasht-e Nesha District, Rasht County, Gilan Province, Iran. At the 2006 census, its population was 9,187, in 2,867 families. The rural district has 16 villages.

References 

Rural Districts of Gilan Province
Rasht County